The 2019 New Zealand local elections were triennial elections to select local government officials and district health board members. Under section 10 of the Local Electoral Act 2001, a "general election of members of every local authority or community board must be held on the second Saturday in October in every third year" from the date the Act came into effect in 2001, meaning 12 October 2019.

Most of the local elections were run by one of two companies on behalf of individual local bodies. Sometimes the company also provides the electoral officer.

Election schedule
Key dates relating to the general election were as follows:

Results
In Auckland, Phil Goff was re-elected Mayor and at least 16 of the city's 20 councillors retained their seats, with two new councillors winning seats which were vacated by retirement. In Hamilton, incumbent mayor Andrew King lost to Paula Southgate, who previously challenged him in 2016, while four controversial councillors were voted out of office. In Wellington incumbent mayor Justin Lester was unseated by Andy Foster, who received a high-profile endorsement from filmmaker Sir Peter Jackson. The election also marked the first time a Green Party member was elected to serve as a mayor in New Zealand, with Aaron Hawkins being elected Mayor of Dunedin.

According to The Spinoff editor Toby Manhire, the 2019 local elections had the lowest number of candidate nominations relative to the total number of available seats. Of the 572 local body elections held that year, 101 seats and positions were not contested while 235 candidates were elected unopposed.

Mayoral election summary

Regional council chairs
There are sixteen regions for local government purposes. Eleven are administered by regional councils and five are administered by unitary authorities: Auckland, Gisborne, Tasman, Nelson, and Marlborough. In unitary authorities, the local mayor is the head of government. In the remaining regional councils, the elected members vote for their chair and deputy.

Detailed information 

2019 Northland local elections
2019 Auckland local elections
2019 Waikato local elections
2019 Bay of Plenty local elections
2019 Gisborne local elections
2019 Hawke's Bay local elections
2019 Taranaki local elections
2019 Manawatū-Whanganui local elections
2019 Wellington local elections
2019 Tasman local elections
2019 Nelson local elections
2019 Marlborough local elections
2019 West Coast local elections
2019 Canterbury local elections
2019 Otago local elections
2019 Southland local elections

References

Local elections
Local 2019
October 2019 events in New Zealand